Meeting in Infinity is a collection of science fiction stories by American writer  John Kessel.  It was released in 1992 and was the author's first book published by Arkham House .  It was published in an edition of 3,547 copies.  Most of the stories originally appeared in Isaac Asimov's Science Fiction Magazine and The Magazine of Fantasy and Science Fiction.  "Another Orphan" won a Nebula Award in 1982.

Contents

Meeting in Infinity contains the following stories:

 "Meeting in Infinity"
 "The Pure Product"
 "Mrs. Shummel Exits a Winner"
 "The Big Dream"
 "The Lecturer"
 "Hearts Do Not in Eyes Shine"
 "Faustfeathers"
 "A Clean Escape"
 "Not Responsible! Park and Lock It!"
 "Man"
 "Invaders"
 "Judgment Call"
 "Buddha Nostril Bird"
 "Another Orphan"
 "Buffalo"

Sources

1992 short story collections
Science fiction short story collections
Works by John Kessel